Sosnove is a settlement (posyolok) in Kramatorsk Raion (district) in Donetsk Oblast of eastern Ukraine, at about  north-northwest (NNW) of the centre of Donetsk city. It belongs to Lyman urban hromada, one of the hromadas of Ukraine.

The settlement came under attack by Russian forces during the Russian invasion of Ukraine in 2022 and was regained by Ukrainian forces in September the same year.

References

Populated places in Donetsk Oblast